Despatch is a small town in the Eastern Cape Province of South Africa situated between Port Elizabeth and Uitenhage with an estimated population of 40 000. It forms part of the Nelson Mandela Bay Metropolitan Municipality which includes Port Elizabeth and Uitenhage, and has collectively a population of over 1.3 million.

History
The town of Despatch is situated on rich clay soil and in the late 1800s was the site of a flourishing brick industry. Despatch's name derives from this brick industry history on the account that bricks were dispatched from the original railway siding. Many of the older buildings in Uitenhage and Port Elizabeth were built from these bricks. Most of these early bricks can be identified by the word 'Despatch' imprinted on the top and bottom of the brick. The only reminder of the town's brick industry past is a chimney built in 1882 which formed part of the Brick Works. The Chimney is situated in a field on the outskirts of the town to the north next to the railway lines. In recent years restoration work has brought it back to its former glory including supports which now give it the appearance of a space rocket.

In 1903 the remains of an Algoasaurus were discovered near Despatch.

The township of Despatch was originally developed in 1942 to offer cheaper homing alternative for its fast growing neighbours of Uitenhage and Port Elizabeth. The town obtained official municipal status in 1945 and in 2001 it jointed with Uitenhage, Port Elizabeth and surrounding areas to form the Nelson Mandela Bay Metropolitan Municipality.

Transport

Roads 

Despatch’s main road is “Main Street”/“Botha Street”, a segment of the M19, which stretches from the intersection with the M6 in the eastern end of the town to the intersection with the M10 in the western end of the town. The M19 connects Despatch to Swartkops in the south-east. 

The R75 highway is Despatch’s main highway and bypasses the town, by circling around it from the south to the west of the town. The R75 connects Despatch to Port Elizabeth in the south-west and Uitenhage and Graaff-Reinet in the north-west with two accessible off-ramps within Despatch including the M6 Uitenhage Road (Exit 17) and the M19 Botha Street (Exit 23) off-ramps.

Other than the M19, Despatch is linked by two other metropolitan routes within Nelson Mandela Bay which include the M6 (Uitenhage Road; to Uitenhage) and the M10 (to Bethelsdorp and Uitenhage Industries).

Notable residents
Johan Botha - cricketer
Rassie Erasmus - rugby coach
Adri Geldenhuys—rugby player
Danie Gerber - rugby player
Rynard Landman - rugby player
Rudi Koertzen - cricket umpire
Charl Mattheus - Comrades Marathon runner
Elric van Vuuren - rugby player
Evan van der Merwe - cricket umpire
Sam Gerber - rugby player
Daniel du Plessis - rugby player
Arnold Vosloo - Hollywood Actor
Elandrè Schwartz - Singer

References

External links
 http://www.nelsonmandelabay.gov.za/

Populated places in Nelson Mandela Bay